The London and North Western Railway (LNWR) Prince of Wales Tank Class was a pacific tank engine version of the Prince of Wales Class 4-6-0 steam locomotive.

History
Bowen-Cooke's predecessor George Whale had built 50 related Precursor Tank Class 4-4-2 engines.  In terms of familial relationships, Prince of Wales Tank was both a superheated and extended version of the Precursor Tank, and a version of the Prince of Wales Class 4-6-0 steam locomotive with side tanks and a bunker which necessitated an extension to the frames and trailing pony truck.  They were used on suburban services out of Euston station and from an early date also used on passenger services between Shrewsbury and Swansea (Victoria) over the steeply-graded Central Wales line, a journey of some 120 miles.

The LNWR built 47 of the superheated tanks between 1910 and 1916 under Charles Bowen-Cooke.

LMS service
All passed onto LMS ownership on the 1923 grouping.  The LMS renumbered them 6950–6996 and gave them the power classification 4P.  Withdrawals started in 1935, their replacements being Class 4 2-6-4T designs by Fowler and Stanier.  All were gone by 1941, and no examples were preserved.

Fleet list

References

Prince of Wales, tank
4-6-2T locomotives
Railway locomotives introduced in 1910
Standard gauge steam locomotives of Great Britain
Scrapped locomotives

Passenger locomotives